The Order of Excellence is one of the six national orders of the Jamaican honours system, and it is awarded only to present and former foreign Heads of State or Government. The Order of Excellence is the most recent honour to be created, having been brought into being in 2003. The Order of Excellence took over the function of the Order of Merit, which is now awarded to "persons of notable achievement in particular fields of study".

Recipients

References

Excellence, Order of
Awards established in 2003